This list of museums in Oklahoma encompasses museums, defined for this context as institutions (including nonprofit organizations, government entities, and private businesses) that collect and care for objects of cultural, artistic, scientific, or historical interest and make their collections or related exhibits available for public viewing. Museums that exist only in cyberspace (i.e., virtual museums) are not included.

Main list

Defunct museums
 Center of the American Indian (1978–1992), Oklahoma City
 Derailed Railroad Company Museum, Blackwell, display moved to Top of Oklahoma Historical Society Museum after creator's death
 Ida Dennie Willis Museum of Miniatures, Dolls, and Toys, Tulsa
 Indian City USA Cultural Center, Anadarko
 International Linen Registry Museum, Tulsa
 National Lighter Museum, Guthrie
 Old Santa Fe Depot of Guthrie, Guthrie
 RS & K Railroad Museum, Sayre

See also
 Aquaria in Oklahoma (category)
 Nature Centers in Oklahoma

References

External links
Historical Museums Guide for Oklahoma
Oklahoma Museums Association
TravelOK—Oklahoma's official tourism portal

Oklahoma
Museums
Museums